Louder than Bombs may refer to:

Louder Than Bombs, an album by The Smiths
Louder Than Bombs (film), a 2015 internationally co-produced drama film directed by Joachim Trier

See also
Louder Than a Bomb, an annual poetry slam held in Chicago since 2001
Louder Than a Bomb (film), a 2010 documentary about the poetry slam